The discography of Asher Roth, an American hip hop recording artist, consists of three studio albums, three extended plays (EPs), five mixtapes, 15 singles (including four as a featured artist) and 24 music videos. As of February 2014, his debut album Asleep in the Bread Aisle, has sold 214,000 copies in the US, according to Nielsen SoundScan.

Albums

Studio albums

Mixtapes

EPs

Singles

As lead artist

As featured artist

Guest appearances

Music videos

As lead artist

As featured artist

Notes

References

External links 
 
 
 
 

Discographies of American artists
Hip hop discographies